Matyldów may refer to the following places:
Matyldów, Łódź Voivodeship (central Poland)
Matyldów, Płock County in Masovian Voivodeship (east-central Poland)
Matyldów, Sochaczew County in Masovian Voivodeship (east-central Poland)